Clarence "Dutch" Wallace (April 18, 1900 – February 1977) was a professional football player who played four seasons in the National Football League. He made his debut in the NFL in 1923 with the Akron Pros. He played for the Akron Pros, Akron Indians, Canton Bulldogs and Cleveland Bulldogs over the course of his career.

References

1900 births
1977 deaths
Players of American football from Akron, Ohio
Akron Indians players
Akron Pros players
Canton Bulldogs players
Cleveland Bulldogs players